Ronald McDonald, commonly simply known mononymously as Mac, is a fictional character on the FX series It's Always Sunny in Philadelphia, portrayed and created by Rob McElhenney, and co-created with co-stars Glenn Howerton and Charlie Day. Mac is Charlie Kelly's childhood friend and Dennis Reynolds's high school friend and later roommate.

Character overview
Mac is a co-owner of Paddy's, the self-proclaimed bodyguard or "Sheriff" of Paddy's, and is generally the pub's most active manager. Mac is played by Rob McElhenney.

Mac frequently uses his signature line, "What's up, bitches?" throughout the series. In many episodes, Mac will enter the bar announcing "I've got news" or a variation of the phrase, to set the episode's plot in motion. The others rarely share his enthusiasm, but he usually convinces one of them to follow him, though often reluctantly. Throughout the series, Mac uses a "puppy-dog look" when he is ashamed or when he proposes something reprehensibly shameful.

Name
For the first six seasons, Mac's full name was not revealed, though in the season four episode "Mac & Charlie Die," Mac's father's name is listed as "Luther Mac" on his parole papers and his mother is referred to as Mrs. Mac.  In the episode "Who Got Dee Pregnant?," one of the McPoyle brothers refers to Mac as "Macwell." In the episode "The Gang Cracks the Liberty Bell" Mac, or at least Mac's 18th Century counterpart, is called "McDonald," suggesting that this is his surname. Mac's full real name, Ronald McDonald, is revealed in the season seven episode "The High School Reunion". Mac hates the name due to its connection with the mascot of McDonald's as well as his old nickname, "Ronnie the Rat," which he obtained from ratting on his peers in high school. He prefers to be simply called "Mac".

Description
Mac comes from a broken home; his father has been incarcerated for dealing meth and his mother is extremely apathetic and unemotional. He is very deep in denial of the fact that his parents do not love him and he constantly denies the fact that he may have had a rough childhood, despite the contrary being obviously true (for example at Christmas his family would break into other peoples' houses and steal their presents, which he insists to be a Philadelphia tradition). He sees himself as a karate expert and total "badass". Mac constantly seeks the acceptance of others, especially his parents, but his over-earnest efforts do not endear him to others. Earlier, under the impression that his father would possibly murder him after being paroled, Mac later receives a warm letter from his father, specifically requesting that Mac stay away from him. This letter is written as Mac's father fears that Mac's destructive tendencies could harm him. Dennis notes that the only reason Mac hung out with the popular kids in high school was because he sold them all weed and even then was considered an "asshole."

Mac is considered by every member of The Gang to be a "jerk" and is nearly always the first to start betraying the others. He has repeatedly shown his misogynistic views, believing himself to be superior to women and even stating that he outright "hates" women. Like Dennis, Mac sees himself as superior to the rest of The Gang and often attempts to prove his supremacy. For instance, in an attempt to impress Charlie and Dennis, he makes a series of "Project Badass" videotapes that consist of various idiotic stunts set to music.

Mac sincerely believes that he is an adept martial artist with "cat-like reflexes" and usually wears sleeveless shirts to draw attention to his physique and exhibit his tribal tattoos. Despite his enthusiasm towards karate, he is shown to have no real skills in the sport.

Religion
A Catholic, Mac is the only member of The Gang to profess a religious faith. In "The Gang Exploits a Miracle," Mac fears that the Lord will show his wrath if they continue to exploit a water stain in the bar that appears to depict the Virgin Mary. Though Mac seems to care more about issues such as abortion, community activism, and parenting than the rest of The Gang, his views on such subjects are invariably twisted, ignorant, or prejudiced. For instance, after pretending to be adamantly pro-life in order to attract a female activist, Mac later demands that she get an abortion when he thinks she has become pregnant by him. In another instance, Mac discovers that Carmen has married and had the operation to remove her penis. He then belittles Carmen and her husband by quoting the Bible to them and calling them gay; however, he only reacts so because he expected Carmen to call him after the operation so they could date again. Mac constantly drinks alcohol, like the rest of The Gang, and misuses other substances, such as poppers and glue. In recent seasons, Mac has sometimes expressed Anti-Semitism, from his rant about Mark Zuckerberg and "his Jews" using Facebook and other social media to take over the world in "The Anti-Social Network" and, in "The Gang Group Dates," telling a disgusted Frank and Charlie that he wants to make sure any women he might date are not Jewish.

Sexuality
While Mac has sexual exploits with various women, including two models in immediate succession, a long-running theme on the show is the ambiguity surrounding Mac's sexuality which culminates in him coming out as gay in season 12. In earlier seasons, this is manifested by his obsession with men's physiques and his reactionary religious views on homosexuality. In "Mac's Banging the Waitress," Charlie suggests to Dennis that Mac is attempting to seduce them after he tries to demonstrate how "badass" he is by falling from the roof onto a pile of mattresses. In "Mac Is a Serial Killer," he secretly hooks up with Carmen, a pre-op transgender woman. In "Mac Fights Gay Marriage," after learning that Carmen is married to a guy, he claims that it is gay marriage due to Carmen being born male. However, everyone else thinks he is jealous that Carmen did not marry him and that he might be gay because he slept with her before her gender reassignment. Mac is then called out for possibly being a closeted homosexual, which he immediately refutes, and an argument ensues when he claims for it not to be true. In "Mac Day," Charlie says, "I know we've never said this as a group, but Mac's gay," to which the rest of The Gang readily agrees. In Season 10, when Dennis is listing all of the delusions The Gang has about themselves, he tells Mac, "you convince yourself that you're tough and that you're straight." After a pause, Mac retorts, "I AM tough!" In "The Gang Misses the Boat," Mac convinces The Gang that he is sleeping with an attractive woman; however, they later discover that he merely paid her with angel dust to pretend they were together. She tells them that he "couldn't even get it up" for her.

In "The Gang Goes to Hell," Mac, while on a Christian cruise, discovers that two other male passengers are gay and sets out to "convert" them. The two, however, "convert" Mac within minutes. This supposed realization of his repressed homosexuality results in the end of his belief in God. After The Gang is informed by Mac of his new identity, they tell him they have known since the first day they met him and proceed to move on with their self-involved lives. Later in the episode, Mac and the rest of The Gang are trapped inside the cruise ship's flooding brig, and Mac tries one last time to pray to God to save all of them from imminent death. They are released in the nick of time. Mac later explains to The Gang and an insurance claim agent that God does exist, and he, Mac, is indeed straight because his prayer was answered and no loving God "would make" him gay. 

In "Hero or Hate Crime," the Gang uses Mac's altered workout bike as evidence of his homosexuality during a legal arbitration. Mac is forced to admit his sexuality to win the dispute, but the Gang expects him to return to the closet after the process is over. However, when given an opportunity to retract his admission, Mac finally decides to embrace his identity. In "Mac Finds His Pride," Mac finally comes out to his father as gay. Despite his father disapproving of his sexuality, Mac is not ashamed by his own father's distaste for finding out he is gay. (It was earlier implied in the series that Mac's father Luther is at least bisexual, from a description by Charlie's mother of a threesome during which Luther had sex with the other man.)

It is implied throughout the show that Mac has feelings for Dennis, whom he tries to kiss on multiple occasions, and has gone as far as to buy a sex doll modeled after Dennis in "The Gang Makes Paddy's Great Again."

Family

Weight gain and subsequent loss
At the start of season 7, Mac has gained at least  of fat, which he saw as a step to developing muscle ("cultivating mass" in his words) to go from "a tiny twink to [a] muscle-bound freak." In the episode "How Mac Got Fat," he goes into greater detail about his intentions, explaining that earlier, the Gang had decided to replace themselves with avatars to run Paddy's Pub so they could slack off. Mac's avatar was a bodybuilder. When Dee points out that the avatar does not look like him because he has more muscle, Mac starts gaining weight in an attempt to become the same size as the bodybuilder. Eventually the Gang drops the avatar plan and everything goes back to normal, but Mac is stuck with his dangerous weight gain. The rest of The Gang agrees he looks unhealthy—Dennis is personally outraged by the sight of his gut—but Mac is indifferent to their opinions despite developing diabetes as a result of his new eating habits.

The weight gain was real. Rob McElhenney has stated in interviews that he wanted to make Mac fat as his own way of fighting the trend of actors on TV shows getting more attractive as a show gains success (he specifically talked about The Big Bang Theory and how the nerdy lead characters were better-dressed and had trendier hairstyles as the show became a huge hit for CBS), and that it also made sense that Mac would be aging badly thanks to the reckless, selfish, and stupid lifestyle of which he and the rest of the characters are so proud.

To gain the weight for Season 7 in the healthiest way possible, McElhenney worked with a nutritionist recommended by professional baseball player Chase Utley (who had played himself in the Season 6 episode "The Gang Gets Stranded in the Woods"). He ate an average of 5,000 calories a day during the weight gain and lost the weight by returning to his normal eating and workout routines. In the Season 8 episode "The Gang Gets Analyzed" it is revealed in the show that Mac lost his weight from taking 'Size Pills' (Mexican Ephedra) given to him by Dennis who found him to be 'disgusting' when he was overweight. We also find out that Mac preferred being overweight as it made him 'scary' to other people.

References 

Antisemitism in fiction
Fictional alcohol abusers
Fictional bartenders
Fictional characters from Philadelphia
Fictional drug dealers
Fictional gay males
Fictional LGBT characters in television
It's Always Sunny in Philadelphia characters
Television characters introduced in 2005